A shell collapsar is a hypothetical compact astrophysical object, which might constitute an alternative explanation for observations of astronomical black hole candidates. It is a collapsed star that resembles a black hole, but is formed without a point-like central singularity and without an event horizon. The model of the shell collapsar was first proposed by Trevor W. Marshall and allows the formation of neutron stars beyond the Tolman–Oppenheimer–Volkoff limit of 0.7 M☉.

A shell collapsar is void inside apart from intense gravitational field energy there. According to Newton's shell theorem, the acceleration of gravity in the center of each celestial body is zero and rises to its surface (cf. gravitational field in the interior of the earth (PREM)). Without acceleration of gravity, the curvature of spacetime in the center of each celestial body is zero. With neutron stars beyond the Tolman–Oppenheimer–Volkoff limit, the time dilation due to gravity is extreme on its surface, so that the neutron star freezes on its outer shell. Another possible explanation is that when Newton's 1 / r² law is left, the Newtonian shell theorem no longer applies at the location of the strongest curvature, outward gravitational forces arise and pull the inner matter into the shell.

The shell collapsar is a special case of a gravastar. With the gravastar, an exotic form of matter stabilizes the object with the equation of state of dark energy inside. The shell collapsar comes to a similar result with ordinary neutron star matter and simply Einstein's field equations describing intense gravitational energy density, comparable as E/c² to the neutron matter density.

References

Hypothetical astronomical objects